Saltanat-e-Dil (Eng lit; Kingdom of Heart) is a 2014 Pakistani drama serial directed by Bashar Momin director Syed Ali Raza Usama, produced by Asif Raza Mir and Babar Javed and written by Myra Sajid. The drama stars Sami Khan, Sarah Khan and Aleezay Rasool in lead roles, and premiered on 18 December 2014 on Geo Entertainment, where it aired on Thursday nights at 8:00 PST. It was the second appearance of Sami Khan and Aleezay Rasool after Bikhra Mera Naseeb.

Synopsis 
Set in district Shahpur, the story revolves around Wajdan (Sami Khan) and Anushay (Sarah Khan) who are in love with each other and plans to marry. Wajdan belongs to an upper class family and lives with his mother Mehtab Bano (Asma Abbas). Being the sole owner and in position of power, Mehtab Bano expects everyone to obey her rules and regulations. Wajdan loves his mother a lot and respects her every decision. Differences between them arise when Wajdan expresses his wish to marry Anushay. Mehtab Bano refuses as Anushay belongs to a middle class family. In her point of view, differences between class and status leads to poor relationships. On the other hand, Wajdan is adamant on marrying Anushay while Mehtab Bano begins to despise Anushay and goes on to plan her murder. As Anushay struggles between life and death, Mehtab Bano forces Wajdan to marry a girl of her own choice, Rania (Alizey Rasool). Wajdan is unable to accept Rania as his wife and tells her that he still loves Anushay. Saltanat-e-Dil is a compelling story of three individuals as they are manipulated by Mehtab Bano's tricks.

Cast and characters 
Sami Khan as Nawab Wajdaan Shah
Asma Abbas as Mehtab Bano (Amma Begum)
Sarah Khan as Anushey Hayat
Alizey Rasool as Rania
Mazhar Ali as Fazal Hayat
Fazila Qazi as Shehr Bano
Seemi Pasha as Sultana Hayat
Yasir Mazhar as Aleem
Amir Qureshi as Sarfaraz Shah
Syed Ali Hassan as Imran
Parvez Raza
Junaid Butt
Fozia Samoo
Anwer Iqbal

Guest Appearance
Abdullah Ejaz as Nawab Farhan Shah

Reception
Although the drama serial had a cast of Asma Abbas, Fazila Qazi, Sami Khan, and Sarah Khan it was disliked by some viewers due to the ascendency of Hindi serials, and that it was based on the familiar theme of one man with two wives. Syed Ali Raza Usama's direction was appreciated but despite its high budget it had poor ratings.

References

2014 Pakistani television seasons